Arisa  is a feminine Japanese given name.

Possible writings
Arisa can be written using many different combinations of kanji characters. Here are some examples: 

有紗, "have, thin silk"
有沙, "have, sand"
愛里沙, "love, village, sand"
愛里咲, "love, village, bloom"
愛理沙, "love, logic, sand"
亜里砂, "Asia, village, sand"
亜莉茶, "Asia, jasmine, tea"
亜璃瑳, "Asia, glassy, lustrous"
安里紗, "tranquil, village, sand"

The name can also be written in hiragana ありさ or katakana アリサ.

Notable people with the name
, Japanese voice actress
, Japanese voice actress
, Japanese badminton player
, Japanese volleyball player
, Japanese speed skater
Arisa Kanayama (金山 亜莉紗, born 1994), Japanese women's baseballer
, Japanese actress
, Japanese women's footballer
, Japanese freestyle skier
, Japanese beauty pageant winner
, Japanese professional wrestler
, Japanese voice actress and singer
, Japanese actress and voice actress
, Japanese volleyball player
, Japanese model and weathercaster
, Japanese actress
, Japanese volleyball player

Other people
Arisa Cox (born 1978), Canadian television and radio personality
Arisa White, American poet

Fictional characters
, keyboardist of the band Poppin'Party from the multimedia franchise BanG Dream!
, a character in The Idolmaster Million Live!
Arisa Uotani (魚谷 ありさ), a character in Fruits Basket

See also
 Alisa (disambiguation)

Japanese feminine given names